Scott Olumide Durojaiye (born 20 October 1992) is a Nigerian semi-professional footballer who plays as a midfielder for Haringey Borough.

He played youth football for Tottenham Hotspur and Norwich City, before joining Scottish sides Falkirk and Brechin City. He has also played for non-league clubs Braintree Town, Enfield Town, Dartford, Hayes & Yeading United, Hungerford Town, Haringey Borough, Maidstone United, Welling United and Woking.

Club career 
Durojaiye joined Tottenham Hotspur at the age of seven and worked his way through the ranks up to the Under-18s as a striker. After failing to be offered a professional contract, trialled with Cheltenham Town, Brentford and Oxford United before moving to Norwich City in August 2012. He signed a one-year professional deal but was released at the end of the season.

In July 2013, Durojaiye signed for Scottish Championship club Falkirk. He spent two seasons at the club before his release in May 2015.

On 20 February 2015, Durojaiye joined Scottish League One side Brechin City on loan for the remainder of the season.

Durojaiye joined Isthmian League Premier Division club Enfield Town ahead of the 2015–16 season. He failed to score for the club in 12 appearances and was released in early November. The following month, he completed a move to Haringey Borough.

In February 2016, Durojaiye joined Hayes & Yeading United and began playing in a defensive role. After a short spell at Hungerford Town ahead of the 2016–17 season, he returned to Hayes & Yeading for a second time in October 2016. He went on to score twice in 20 appearances for the club.

In December 2016, he returned to Haringey Borough. Durojaiye made 20 appearances for the club, including in the Isthmian League Division One North play-off semi-final, and scored braces against Bury Town and Great Wakering Rovers.

In August 2017, Durojaiye joined National League South club Welling United after impressing in a pre-season trial. On 5 August, he made his debut replacing Toby Ajala in a 3–2 defeat to Truro City.

Durojaiye joined Braintree Town for the 2017–18 season. On 10 September 2018, it was announced that Durojaiye had left the club despite starting all seven league fixtures.

On 21 September 2018, following his departure from Braintree, Durojaiye agreed to join fellow National League side, Maidstone United.

On 26 February 2019, Olumide agreed to join National League South side Woking, following a spell back at Haringey Borough.

Despite gaining promotion during his spell with Woking, prior to the 2019–20 campaign, Durojaiye opted to return to Haringey Borough once more.

On 22 January 2021, Durojaiye rejoined National League South side Welling United. On 18 March 2022, Welling United announced that Durojaiye was one of five players that had left the club.

On 26 March 2022, Durojaiye joined Dartford. He made his debut for the club on the same day, coming on as a second-half substitute in a 1-0 victory at Princes Park against Hampton & Richmond Borough.

On 6 July 2022, Durojaiye joined Hereford. However, on 3 August 2022 - under a month after signing for Hereford and before the National League North 2022-23 season kicked off - Durojaiye left the club having only appeared in a handful of pre-season friendlies.

International career 
Durojaiye is eligible to play for Nigeria and England and has previously expressed his desire to represent Nigeria. He was called up to the Under-20 Development squad.

Career statistics

References

1992 births
Living people
Welling United F.C. players
Falkirk F.C. players
Brechin City F.C. players
Enfield Town F.C. players
Haringey Borough F.C. players
Hayes & Yeading United F.C. players
Hungerford Town F.C. players
Braintree Town F.C. players
Maidstone United F.C. players
Woking F.C. players
Dartford F.C. players
Hereford F.C. players
National League (English football) players
Isthmian League players
Southern Football League players
Scottish Professional Football League players
Association football midfielders
Nigerian footballers
Nigerian expatriate footballers
Expatriate footballers in England
Expatriate footballers in Scotland
Black British sportspeople